Lemuria is the eleventh full-length musical album by symphonic metal band Therion. The album title refers to the name of a supposed sunken continent Lemuria, much like Atlantis. It was released simultaneously with Sirius B. Cover artwork was made by Thomas Ewerhard.

Track listing

Concept of lyrics
Typhon was a monster in Greek mythology. According to Aeschylus, he fought all the gods of Olympus: Zeus defeated him and chained him under Mount Etna, from where his rage creates eruptions.
Futhark was a runic alphabet used by various Germanic peoples; Uthark is an occult interpretation of said alphabet.
Berik is the mythological chief of all Gothic tribes: according to Jordanes, he departed from his Scandinavian motherland with three ships. The crews of the ships were the ancestors of the three Goth tribes.
Lemuria was a hypothetical "lost land", like Atlantis.
Quetzalcoatl is an Aztec deity.
Abaris was a legendary sage and priest of Apollo.
Emanuel Swedenborg was an 18th-century Christian mystic, whose work became the foundation of The New Church.
Abraxas is a Gnostic word of great importance.

Credits
Christofer Johnsson - lead vocals ("Typhon", "Three Ships of Berik part 1: Calling to Arms and Fighting the Battle"), rhythm guitar, keyboards ("An Arrow from the Sun", "Feuer Overtüre / Prometheus Entfesselt"), classical and choir arrangements
Kristian Niemann - lead guitar, acoustic guitar
Johan Niemann - bass guitar

Guest musicians
Steen Rasmussen - mellotron ("Lemuria"), Hammond organ
Jens Nyborg - balalaika, domra
Sven Lindblad - balalaika
Kavi Björkqvist - balalaika
Richard Evensand - drums
Mats Levén - lead vocals ("Uthark Runa"), rock and roll vocals ("Abraxas")
Piotr Wawrzeniuk - lead vocals ("Lemuria", "The Dreams of Swedenborg", "Feuer Overtüre / Prometheus Entfesselt")
Peter Mossman - narration ("Lemuria")
Orchestra: Prague Philharmonic Orchestra (conducted by Adam Klemens and Mario Klemens)
Choir: Kūhn Mixed Choir (conducted by Mario Klemens)

Charts

References

External links
 
 
 Information about album at the official website

2004 albums
Therion (band) albums
Nuclear Blast albums